Sir Veerasamy Ringadoo, GCMG, GCSK, QC, (born Vīracāmi Riṅkāṭu; 20 October 1920 – 9 September 2000) was a Mauritian politician, minister, the sixth and last governor-general of Mauritius from 1986 to 1992, and then the first president of Mauritius from March to June 1992.

Early life 
Born in 1920 in an Indian Tamil family, Ringadoo was educated at Port Louis Grammar School and completed his LLB at the London School of Economics in 1948.  He was also a founder of the League of Tamils in 1937.

Political career
At the 1953 general elections he was elected for the first time to the Legislative Council in Moka-Flacq, representing Labour Party alongside Ackbar Gujadhur and Satcam Boolell. At the 1959 and 1963 elections he was elected to the Legislative Council at No. 17 Quartier Militaire after standing as candidate of Labour Party. 

In 1967, he was elected to Legislative Council at Constituency No. 8 (Quartier Militaire-Moka) as candidate of the Independence Party coalition alongside Mahess Teeluck and Abdool Razack Mohamed. 

In 1976, he was re-elected at No. 8, alongside Mahess Teeluck. He held the portfolio of finance minister of Mauritius during most of these terms. But at the 1982 general elections he was not elected following the landslide victory of MMM-PSM against PTr-PMSD.

He served as governor-general of Mauritius from 17 January 1986 to 12 March 1992, when it became a republic. Ringadoo then served as interim president until later in 1992, when he was replaced by the second president, Cassam Uteem.

Recognition
Ringadoo was knighted in the 1975 New Year Honours, and following his appointment as Governor-General, appointed a Knight Grand Cross of the Order of St. Michael and St. George in June 1986.

References

1920 births
2000 deaths
Labour Party (Mauritius) politicians
Presidents of Mauritius
Ministers of Finance of Mauritius
Governors-General of Mauritius
Knights Grand Cross of the Order of St Michael and St George
Knights Bachelor
Mauritian Hindus
Mauritian Knights Bachelor
Mauritian Queen's Counsel
Mauritian Tamil politicians
Mauritian people of Indian descent
Mauritian people of Tamil descent
Alumni of the London School of Economics
Mauritian politicians of Indian descent